Commercial Road is located in the City of Gloucester, England. It runs from The Quay and Severn Road in the north to Kimbrose Way and Southgate Street in the south. It is joined by Barbican Road and Ladybellegate Street on the north side and by entrances to Gloucester Docks on the south side.

On the north side on the corner with Barbican Road is the former Gloucester Prison and the former site of Blackfriars on the corner with Ladybellegate Street.

Listed buildings

Commercial Road contains a number of listed buildings:

North side
 Gloucester Prison Governor's House
 Black Swan Hotel

South side
 Dock Company Office
 City Flour Mills
 Soldiers of Gloucestershire Museum, formerly the Customs House
 27 and 29 Northgate Street
 Navigation House
 Criterion Hotel
 3 Commercial Road
 1 Commercial Road

See also
 Thomas Talbot (bottler)

References

External links 

Streets in Gloucester